"Voice" (stylized as "VOICE") is the sixteenth overall single of electropop girl group Perfume. It was released on August 11, 2010 as a CD-only version and CD+DVD version. "Voice" was used in the commercial of "Nissan no Omise de!" Campaign and the B-side "575" was used in the Light Pool phone commercial by KDDI iida.

Track listing

Oricon Charts (Japan)

Certifications

References

2010 singles
Perfume (Japanese band) songs
Songs written by Yasutaka Nakata
Song recordings produced by Yasutaka Nakata
2010 songs